The scrawled cowfish (Acanthostracion quadricornis) is a species of boxfish native to the western tropical and equatorial Atlantic, as well as the Gulf of Mexico. It is common to occasional in Florida and Bahamas; occasional to uncommon in the Caribbean. It also occurs in the Gulf of Mexico, north to Massachusetts, Bermuda and south to Brazil in tropical and warm temperate waters.

Reproduction
The scrawled cowfish spawns during the months of January and February, and July through September. They release the eggs in pelagic waters and eventually settle as juveniles out of the water column.

Description

It has distinctive features such as a scrawled pattern of bluish markings covering its body; a blue line runs from snout to anal fin and it has a pair of sharp spines above each eye, giving the name "cowfish" because they resemble the horns of a cow. This latter point distinguishes cowfish from trunkfish.  Overall it is colored blue-green to yellow cast. However, it may darken, pale and change color. Significantly it has two sharp spines in front of anal fin. Pelvic fins and spiny dorsal fin are not found on the cowfish. Almost always there will be dark, blotchy spots along the body, and three to four horizontal lines on the cheek. They have usually less than fifteen teeth in each jaw.  As with other species of boxfish, the scrawled cowfish's bony carapace gives it a distinctly angular appearance; its oblate form has been compared to a frisbee.

Habitat
Because the scrawled cowfish is a shallow water species, it will mostly always be found in and along grass beds. If disturbed it may remain motionless apparently relying on camouflage.

Diet
The scrawled cowfish likes to eat small invertebrates such as crabs, other crustaceans, sea anemones, sponges, gorgonians, and tunicates. It also will feed on some species of marine vegetation.

Importance to humans

Scrawled cowfish can be quite tasty if cooked properly. It is locally abundant in the Caribbean region and often sold fresh. Although they are very good to eat, in many places around the world they are used as an aquarium fish because of their beautiful coloration.

Notes

References
Humann, P. & Deloach, N., Reef fish identification, Florida, Caribbean, Bahamas, 2003, 481 p., p. 388-389
Acanthostracion Quadricornis Summary Page." FishBase. N.p., n.d. Web. 04 May 2014. <http://www.fishbase.org/summary/92>.
"FLMNH Ichthyology Department: Scrawled Cowfish." FLMNH Ichthyology Department: Scrawled Cowfish. N.p., n.d. Web. 4 May 2014. <https://www.flmnh.ufl.edu/fish/Gallery/Descript/ScrawledCowfish/scrawledcowfish.html>.
Page, L. M., H. Espinosa-Perez, L.T. Findley, C. R. Gilbert, R. N. Lea, N. E. Mandrak, R. L. Mayden, and J. S. Nelson. 2013. Common and scientific names of the fishes from the United States, Canada, and Mexico, 7th Edition. American Fisheries Society, Special Publication 34, Bethesda Maryland.

External links
 

scrawled cowfish
Fish of the Eastern United States
Fish of the Western Atlantic
scrawled cowfish
scrawled cowfish